Salem Avenue–Roanoke Automotive Commercial Historic District is a national historic district located of Roanoke, Virginia.  It encompasses 59 contributing buildings in the southwestern part of the City of Roanoke.  The district includes a variety of buildings having automotive, warehouse, light industrial and residential uses. Most of the buildings are small-scale, one or two-story brick or concrete block buildings, with the majority built between about 1920 and 1954. Notable buildings include the former Enfield Buick Dealership (c. 1930), Lindsay-Robinson & Co. Building (1918), Fulton Motor Company Auto Sales & Service (1928), Lacy Edgerton Motor Company (c. 1927), Roanoke Motor Car Company (c. 1946), and Fire Department No. 3 (1909).

It was listed on the National Register of Historic Places in 2007, with boundary increases in 2008 and 2014.

References

Historic districts on the National Register of Historic Places in Virginia
Commercial buildings on the National Register of Historic Places in Virginia
Buildings and structures in Roanoke, Virginia
National Register of Historic Places in Roanoke, Virginia